Croatia–Spain relations refer to the bilateral relationship between Croatia and Spain. Diplomatic relations among two countries were established on March 9, 1992 following Croatia's independence from SFR Yugoslavia. The two nations enjoy largely positive relations. Both countries are full members of the European Union and NATO.
Spain has given full support to Croatia's membership in the European Union and NATO.

History
Croatia–Spain relations date far back into history, at least as early as the 16th century. During 1516-18 Uskok War, Spanish Empire officially sided with the Kingdom of Croatia against Venice and Ottoman Empire.

During The Spanish Civil War
Many Croats participated in Spanish Civil War, mostly on the side of Republicans, including Josip Broz Tito who later become  president of Socialist Federal Republic of Yugoslavia. The Croatian public was very sensitive about the Spanish Civil War which was well covered in the Croatian media and political arena. Youth members of the Party of Rights sent a telegram of support to Francisco Franco, a Nationalist, while League of Communists of Yugoslavia began to send volunteers to help Republicans. Party or Catholic media, such as Hrvatska straža (right wing) or Proleter (left wing), were bringing information in accordance with their ideology. While Hrvatska straža was writing daily about the persecution of religion and crimes committed by Republicans and was calling for "a joint fight against the red danger and ghosts of atheism", Proleter was writing about crimes committed by Nationalists and was calling for "an international fight against the scourge of fascism" and was denouncing the church as co-responsible for crimes. The left wing press was constantly emphasizing the importance of fighting for the national rights of Catalans, Basques and others, comparing it with bad status of Croats in the Kingdom of Yugoslavia, while the right wing (Ustaše) press, while fighting against Serbian unitarianism within the Kingdom of Yugoslavia, hadn't paid much attention to aspirations of Catalans and Basques in Spain. The Catholic Church was constantly emphasizing the anti-religious and anti-clerical character of Republicans, depicting Franco as protector of the faith, Church, and the Christian tradition.

Post WWII 
After the Second World War and the destruction of the Nazi puppet state, the so-called Independent State of Croatia, Spain, led by Francisco Franco, accepted a lot of those which fled from the liberated territory, and newly founded Socialist Federal Republic of Yugoslavia, including dictator Ante Pavelić and his family.

Present Status 
Spain provided strong support to the Croatian ascension to the EU. On July 1, 2013, Spain welcomed Croatian EU ascension by hanging festive red cravat, invented by Croats, on the Cibeles Palace.

In March 2022, Andrej Plenković visited Spain in what it was the first official visit by a Croatian prime minister in 25 years. The respective science ministers from both countries signed a joint declaration announcing the Croatian support to the 'International Fusion Materials Irradiation Facility - Demo Oriented Neutron Source', a project intended to be built in Granada.

Economic cooperation
In 2013 Croatia exported €40,800,000 worth of goods to Spain and imported from it €234,300,000 worth of goods. 
Recently, the air connectivity between the two countries has increased significantly.

Croatian officials main visits to Spain 
 June 28, 1994, Mate Granić foreign minister
 July 21, 1997, Zlatko Mateša Prime Minister.
 October 10, 2000, Stjepan Mesić President of Croatia
 March 1, 2001, Tonino Picula foreign minister
 October 25, 2001, Ivica Račan Prime Minister
 June 9, 2004, Miomir Žužul foreign minister
 March 8, 2005, Stjepan Mesić President of Croatia

Spanish officials main visits to Croatia 

 February 2, 1994, Javier Solana Minister of Foreign Affairs
 August 16, 1995 Javier Solana Minister of Foreign Affairs
 February 12, 1996, Carlos Westendorp Minister of Foreign Affairs
 November 11, 2000, Josep Piqué Minister of Foreign Affairs
 November 24, 2000, José María Aznar Prime Minister
 May 19, 2005, Miguel Ángel Moratinos Minister of Foreign Affairs

Resident diplomatic missions 
 Croatia has an embassy in Madrid.
 Spain has an embassy in Zagreb.

See also
 Foreign relations of Croatia
 Foreign relations of Spain

References

External links
   Croatian Ministry of Foreign Affairs and European Integration: list of bilateral treaties with Spain
  Croatian embassy in Madrid (in Croatian and Spanish only)
  Spanish Ministry of Foreign Affairs about relations with Croatia (in Spanish only)
  Spanish embassy in Zagreb (in Spanish only)

 
Spain 
Bilateral relations of Spain